The following Confederate Army units and commanders fought in the Battle of Raymond; the Union order of battle is listed separately.

Major General Ulysses S. Grant of the Union Army landed 24,000 men at Bruinsburg, Mississippi, on April 30, 1863, as part of the Vicksburg campaign, an operation intended to capture the important Mississippi River city of Vicksburg, Mississippi.  On May 1, his men having driven east from the river, the Grant's men defeated the Confederates at the Battle of Port Gibson.  After Port Gibson, Grant could choose to either attack Vicksburg from the south, or to march further to the east and then turn around and move west against the city.  He decided upon the latter, as it gave greater prospects of capturing the Confederate army defending Vicksburg, in addition to the city itself.

As part of his movement to the east, Grant sent Major General James B. McPherson's corps in the direction of Raymond, Mississippi. Meanwhile, a Confederate brigade commanded by Brigadier General John Gregg, moved into Raymond on May 11.  The next day, the two sides made contact southwest of Raymond along Fourteenmile Creek.  Gregg did not realize he was outnumbered, and fought aggressively, attacking part of the Union line.  Eventually, Union reinforcements arrived on the scene, and Gregg's left flank was driven back.  The Confederates then broke off the fighting and fell back to Jackson, Mississippi, reaching their destination on May 13.  McPherson's men suffered 442 casualties, while the Confederates suffered 514 men killed, wounded, or missing.

Gregg's command consisted of his brigade of infantrymen from Texas and Tennessee, as well as Bledsoe's Missouri Battery, an artillery unit.  During the battle, Colonel Cyrus A. Sugg commanded the brigade itself, while Gregg was in overall command on the field.  The Confederate force was also supplemented two by small cavalry units.  Colonel A. P. Thompson's unit of mounted infantry from Kentucky reinforced Gregg after the fighting ended, and 1,000 men commanded by Brigadier General W. H. T. Walker arrived during the retreat.  Modern historians disagree as to the number of Confederate troops actually present during the fighting.  Shelby Foote gives a Confederate strength of 4,000 men, Donald L. Miller places Gregg's strength at 3,200 men, Edwin C. Bearss gives 3,000, and Christopher Losson provides a range of 2,500 to 3,000 men.

Abbreviations used

Military rank
 BG = Brigadier general
 Col = Colonel
 Ltc = Lieutenant colonel
 Maj = Major
 Cpt = Captain

Other
 k = Killed
 w = Wounded

Confederate forces

Gregg's Task Force
BG John Gregg

See also

 Mississippi in the American Civil War

Notes

References

Sources
 
 
 
 
 
 
 
 
 
 

American Civil War orders of battle
Vicksburg campaign